Samuel Jack Young (born 30 July 2000) is an English cricketer. From Radstock, near Bath, and played for Bath Cricket Club. Young attended Millfield School and joined the Somerset Academy in 2016. Young was named in England's squad for the 2020 Under-19 Cricket World Cup. He made his List A debut on 25 July 2021, for Somerset in the 2021 Royal London One-Day Cup. Prior to his Somerset debut, Young has also played minor counties cricket for Dorset and Cornwall.

References

External links
 

2000 births
Living people
English cricketers
Somerset cricketers
Dorset cricketers
Cornwall cricketers
Cricketers from Plymouth, Devon
People educated at Millfield